Yang Yi (born June 18, 1964) is the pen name of Liu Qiao, a Chinese-born novelist who has lived in Japan since 1987.

Yang was born in the Chinese city of Harbin and remains a Chinese citizen. In 2008, she won the 139th Akutagawa Prize for her (Japanese language) novel Tokiga nijimu asa (literally, A Morning When Time Blurs). She is thus far the only Chinese national and, along with Li Kotomi, one of only two non-native Japanese speakers to win the award.

Currently she is a visiting professor at Kanto Gakuin University and a part-time lecturer at Nihon University.

References

External links
 Yang Yi at J'Lit Books from Japan 

1964 births
Living people
Ochanomizu University alumni
Akutagawa Prize winners
Japanese-language writers
Chinese emigrants to Japan